Rafael Aguilar Guajardo (1950 – 12 April 1993) was a Mexican drug lord, federal police commander of the Direccion Federal de Seguridad (DFS) in Mexico,  and one of the Juárez Cartel co-founders.

He was the right-hand man to Pablo Acosta Villarreal who was killed in April 1987, during a cross-border raid by Mexican Federal Police helicopters in the Rio Grande village of Santa Elena, Chihuahua. Having taken over from Acosta, Rafael Aguilar Guajardo made Amado Carrillo Fuentes his second-in-command.

Mexican police reported that Carlos Maya Castillo, an official also working at the National Security and Investigation Center, assisted Aguilar with information and reservations, provided him with cell phones, and recruited corrupt police agents for Aguilar's criminal organisation.

Two days after threatening to reveal his high-level Mexican government contacts, Amado Carrillo Fuentes took over the reins of power in the Juárez cartel after assassinating Aguilar,  setting off the city's worst ongoing bout of criminal violence. Aguilar's assets seized by the Attorney General of Mexico (PGR) were valued at $100 million, and they included nightclubs, houses, and a 7000 m2 property in Acapulco.

In the streaming television series Narcos: Mexico (2018-2021), he was portrayed by Noé Hernández.

See also
Mérida Initiative
Mexican Drug War

References

Bibliography

1942 births
1993 deaths
Guadalajara Cartel traffickers
Juárez Cartel traffickers
Mexican crime bosses
Mexican money launderers
Mexican drug traffickers
Mexican drug war
People from Ciudad Juárez